Technology Park Bentley is Australia’s second oldest technology park. It opened in 1985. In 1987 the Western Precinct was opened, housing the Australian Resources Research Centre (ARRC).

Technology Park Bentley is a location for organisations engaged in:
	
 Information technology and telecommunications
 Renewable energy and clean technologies
 Life sciences

Tenants

Some 100 companies currently operate at any one time in the Park, which is operating at maximum capacity, while all new tenants require government ministerial approval to locate in the Park. Tenants include Australian Institute of Technology Transfer, Curtin University, Horizon Power and the University of New South Wales, to name a few.

The park is home to iVEC's Pawsey Centre which is a high performance computing centre, named after the ‘father of Australian radio astronomy’ Dr Joseph Lade Pawsey (1908–1962).  The centre hosts new supercomputing facilities and expertise to support the international Square Kilometre Array (SKA) program, geosciences and other high-end science.

Ownership and governance
The Park is governed by the State Government's Industry and Technology Development (ITD) Act (1998), which regulates the nature of businesses that can operate within the park, ensuring tenants’ enterprises have a technological and innovation focus in research and development.

The Western Australian Government's Minister for Commerce, through the Department of Commerce, manages the strategic direction and operations of the park.

Approximately 70% of the land is privately owned.

References

External link 
 

1985 establishments in Australia
Buildings and structures in Perth, Western Australia
Science parks in Australia
Bentley, Western Australia
Kensington, Western Australia